Tobit Raphael is an American actor best known for his role portraying Yo-Yo Santos in the 2013 film, The Internship alongside Owen Wilson and Vince Vaughn.

Early life
Raphael's parents both immigrated from the Philippines to San Francisco, California. He states that he grew up around Filipinos and embraced the culture. Raphael attended UCLA's School of Theatre, Film and Television and graduated in 2011.

Filmography

References

21st-century American male actors
American male actors of Filipino descent
American male film actors
Living people
Male actors from Los Angeles
Year of birth missing (living people)